Berthier—Maskinongé (formerly known as Berthier and Berthier—Maskinongé—Lanaudière) is a federal electoral district in Quebec, Canada, that has been represented in the House of Commons of Canada from 1925 to 1953, from 1968 to 1988, and since 2004. Its population in 2001 was 103,516.

Geography
The riding extends along the north bank of the Saint Lawrence River between the north suburbs of Montreal and Trois-Rivières, straddling the Quebec regions of Lanaudière and Mauricie.

The district includes the Regional County Municipalities of D'Autray and Maskinongé, and the former cities of Pointe-du-Lac and Trois-Rivières-Ouest in the City of Trois-Rivières.

The neighbouring ridings are Joliette, Repentigny, Verchères—Les Patriotes, Bas-Richelieu—Nicolet—Bécancour, Trois-Rivières, and Saint-Maurice—Champlain.

This riding lost territory to Trois-Rivières and gained territory from Joliette during the 2012 electoral redistribution.

History
The riding was created in 1924 from Berthier and Maskinongé. It consisted of Berthier County and Maskinongé County.

In 1947, it was redefined to consist of the county of Berthier and the town of Berthierville, the county of Maskinongé and the town of Louiseville, and Gouin township in the county of Joliette.

In 1952, it was abolished when it was merged into Berthier—Maskinongé—delanaudière riding.

The riding was recreated in 1966 as "Berthier" from the districts of Berthier—Maskinongé—Delanaudière, Chapleau, Joliette—L'Assomption—Montcalm, St-Maurice—Laflèche, and Three Rivers.

In 1975, the name of the riding was changed to "Berthier-Maskinongé". After the 1980 election, the name of the district was changed to Berthier—Maskinongé—Lanaudière.

In the 1984 election, the seat was won by Progressive Conservative Robert de Cotret, who held it until the 1988 election. The riding was abolished in 1987. It was divided between Berthier—Montcalm, Champlain, and Saint-Maurice.

Berthier—Maskinongé was re-created in 2003. 44.8% of the riding came from Trois-Rivières, 36.0% from Berthier—Montcalm, and 19.2% from Saint-Maurice.

In the 2004 election and the 2006 election, Bloc Québécois MP Guy André was elected in the riding.

Members of Parliament

This riding has elected the following Members of Parliament:

Election results

Berthier—Maskinongé, 2004-present

Berthier—Maskinongé, 1975-1988

Berthier, 1968-1975

Berthier—Maskinongé, 1925-1953

	
Note: Progressive Conservative vote is compared to "National Government" vote in 1940 election.

Note: "National Government" vote is compared to Conservative vote in 1935 election.

See also
 List of Canadian federal electoral districts
 Past Canadian electoral districts

References

Campaign expense data from Elections Canada
 Riding history from the Library of Parliament
(1924 - 1952)
(1975 - 1980)
(1981 - 1987)
(2003 - present)

Notes

Louiseville
Politics of Trois-Rivières
Quebec federal electoral districts